A heaving line knot is a family of knots which are used for adding weight to the end of a rope, to make the rope easier to throw. In nautical use, a heaving line knot is often tied to the end of a messenger line, which is then used for pulling a larger rope, such as a hawser. There are several distinct knots which all share the common name, heaving line knot.  The monkey fist is a well-known heaving line knot.

Tying Heaving line knot

Tying Stopper knot
Make a bight in the tail end of the rope. Wrap the working end around the tail toward the bight end, with multiple turns. Complete the knot by passing the tail end through the bight loop.

Similar knots

See also
List of knots
Hangman's knot

Notes

External links
How to Make and Throw a Heaving Line
Animated Knots by Grogg

Nautical terminology